The Art Directors Guild Award for Outstanding Production Design for a One-Hour Contemporary Single-Camera Series is an award handed out annually by the Art Directors Guild. It was introduced at the Art Directors Guilds' 18th annual honors, in 2014. After all television programs were combined for the first four ceremonies, including miniseries for the first, the category narrowed its honorees to single-camera series. From the fifth ceremony until the 13th, the category remained for all single-camera series, before narrowing, again, to honor single-camera series with a length of one-hour. Finally, in 2015, the category re-classified to its current iteration.

Winners and nominations

1990s
Excellence in Production Design Award - Television

2000s
Excellence in Production Design Award - Television, Single Camera Series

Excellence in Production Design Award - Single Camera Television Series

Excellence in Production Design Award - One Hour Single Camera Television Series

2010s

Excellence in Production Design Award - Episode of a One Hour Single-Camera Television Series

Excellence in Production Design Award - One-Hour Contemporary Single-Camera Television Series

2020s

Programs with multiple awards

4 awards
 Mad Men (AMC)

2 awards
 Game of Thrones (HBO)
 The Handmaid's Tale (Hulu)*
 The X-Files (Fox)

Programs with multiple nominations

5 nominations
 The Handmaid's Tale (Hulu)*
 Mad Men (AMC)

4 nominations
 24 (Fox)
 Alias (ABC)
 House of Cards (Netflix)*
 Star Trek: Voyager (UPN)
 Ugly Betty (ABC)

3 nominations
 Better Call Saul (AMC)*
 Boardwalk Empire (HBO)
 Game of Thrones (HBO)
 Glee (Fox)
 Homeland (Showtime)*
 Lost (ABC)
 Pushing Daisies (ABC)
 True Blood (HBO)
 The X-Files (Fox)

2 nominations
 Deadwood (HBO)
 Desperate Housewives (ABC)
 Downton Abbey (PBS)
 Frasier (NBC)
 Heroes (NBC)
 Las Vegas (NBC)
 Mr. Robot (USA)*
 The Newsroom (HBO)*
 Ozark (Netflix)
 True Detective (HBO)*
 The Tudors (Showtime)
 The West Wing'' (NBC)

References

 
American film awards
American television awards
International Alliance of Theatrical Stage Employees
Awards established in 1996